A statue of Caesar Rodney is installed in Wilmington, Delaware, United States.  The statue was erected in Rodney Square in downtown Wilmington on July 4, 1923. It was designed by New York sculptor James Edward Kelly. The Gorham Company in Rhode Island cast the statue and its two bronze plaques. The memorial was removed in June 2020. Its current location, preservation status, and plans for future display are currently unclear, and its removal has generated controversy.

Description
Bronze plaques are affixed to the northwest and southeast sides of the statue's pedestal. One depicts Thomas McKean greeting Rodney in Philadelphia; the other, Rodney casting the deciding vote in favor of American independence. On top of the pedestal Rodney sits astride his horse, which is in full gallop with its front feet in the air, the majority of the statue's weight on the horse's hind legs. To balance the statue, Kelly heavily weighted the horse's tail and positioned Rodney upright and toward the rear of the horse.

History 

Funds for the statue were raised by the Caesar Rodney Equestrian Statue Executive Committee to commemorate the ride of Rodney from Kent County, Delaware to Independence Hall in Philadelphia on July 1 and 2, 1776.

It was removed from public display on June 12, 2020, along with the statue of Christopher Columbus in Wilmington, Delaware in the wake of the protests following the murder of George Floyd. Both statues were temporarily removed after a Dover, Delaware statue honoring law enforcement was vandalized with an axe and urine-soaked Delaware state flags.

See also

 List of monuments and memorials removed during the George Floyd protests
 Statue of Caesar Rodney (U.S. Capitol)
 Statue of Christopher Columbus (Wilmington, Delaware), also removed in June 2020

References

External links
 The Historical Marker Database
 

1923 establishments in Delaware
1923 sculptures
Buildings and structures in Wilmington, Delaware
Equestrian statues in the United States
Monuments and memorials in Delaware
Monuments and memorials removed during the George Floyd protests
Sculptures of men in the United States
Statues in Delaware
Statues of U.S. Founding Fathers
Statues removed in 2020